Plastic film is a thin continuous polymeric material.  Thicker plastic material is often called a "sheet". These thin plastic membranes are used to separate areas or volumes, to hold items, to act as barriers, or as printable surfaces. 

Plastic films are used in a wide variety of applications.  These include: packaging, plastic bags, labels, building construction, landscaping, electrical fabrication, photographic film, film stock for movies, video tape, etc.

Materials
Almost all plastics can be formed into a thin film.  Some of the primary ones are:

 Polyethylene – The most common plastic film is made of one of the varieties of polyethylene: low-density polyethylene,  medium-density polyethylene, high-density polyethylene, or linear low-density polyethylene.
 Polypropylene – Polypropylene can be made a cast film, biaxially oriented film (BOPP), or as a uniaxially oriented film.  
 Polyester – BoPET is a biaxially oriented polyester film.
 Nylon – BOPA/BON is a Biaxially Oriented Polyamide/Nylon - (Commonly known as Nylon)
 Polyvinyl chloride – film can be with or without a Plasticizer
 Cellulose acetate - an early bioplastic.
 Cellophane - made of regenerated cellulose.
 A variety of bioplastics and biodegradable plastics are available. 
 Semiembossed film – Semiembossed film can be used as a liner to the calendered rubber to retain the properties of rubber and also to prevent dust and other foreign matters from sticking to the rubber while calendering and during storage

Processes	

Plastic films are usually thermoplastics and are formed by melting for forming the film.   
 Cast  – Plastics extrusion can cast film which is cooled or quenched then wound up on a roll.
 Extruded film can be stretched, thinned, or oriented in one or two directions. Blown or tubular process forces air into an extruded ring to expand the film.  Flat tenter frames stretch the extruded film before annealing.
 Calender rolls can be used to form film from hot polymers
 Solution deposition is another film forming process.
 Skiving is used to scrape off a film from a solid core (sometimes used to make PTFE thread seal tape)
 Coextrusion involves extruding two or more layers of dissimilar polymers into a single film
 Lamination combines two or more films (or other materials) into a sandwich.
 Extrusion coating is used to form a film onto another film or substrate

Further processing
Plastic films are typically formed into rolls by roll slitting.  Often additional coating or printing operations are also used.  Films can be modified by physical vapor deposition to make metallised films. Films can be subjected to corona treatment or plasma processing; films can have release agents applied as needed.

See also
Converters (industry)
Die cutting (web)
Film base
Film blowing machine
Heat sealer
Journal of Plastic Film and Sheeting
Overwrap
Plastic welding
Plastic wrap
Shrink wrap
Stretch wrap
Thin film

References

Standards by ASTM International
 D882 – Standard Test Method for Tensile Properties of Thin Plastic Sheeting
D1004 –  Standard Test Method for Tear Resistance (Graves Tear) of Plastic Film and Sheeting
D1204 –  Standard Test Method for Linear Dimensional Changes of Nonrigid Thermoplastic Sheeting or Film at Elevated Temperature
D1593 –  Standard Specification for Nonrigid Vinyl Chloride Plastic Film and Sheeting
D1709 – Standard Test Methods for Impact Resistance of Plastic Film by the Free Falling Dart Method
D1894 – Standard Test Method for Static and Kinetic Coefficients of Friction of Plastic Film and Sheeting
D1922 –  Standard Test Method for Propagation Tear Resistance of Plastic Film and Thin Sheeting by Pendulum Method
D1938 –  Standard Test Method for Tear Propagation Resistance of Plastic Film and Thin Sheeting by a Single Tear Method
D2103 – Standard Specification for Polyethylene Film and Sheeting
D2582 – Standard Test Method for Puncture Propagation Tear Resistance of Plastic Film and Thin Sheeting
D2673 – Standard Specification for Oriented Polypropylene Film
D2732 – Standard Test Method for Unrestrained Linear Thermal Shrinkage of Plastic Film and Sheeting
D2838 -Standard Test Method for Shrink Tension and Orientation Release Stress of Plastic Film and Thin Sheeting
D2923 – Standard Test Method for Rigidity of Polyolefin Film and Sheeting
D3420 – Standard Test Method for Pendulum Impact Resistance of Plastic Film
D3595 – Standard Specification for Polychlorotrifluoroethylene (PCTFE) Extruded Plastic Sheet and Film
D3664 –  Standard Specification for Biaxially Oriented Polymeric Resin Film for Capacitors in Electrical Equipment
D3985 – Standard Test Method for Oxygen Gas Transmission Rate Through Plastic Film and Sheeting Using a Coulometric Sensor
D4321 –  Standard Test Method for Package Yield of Plastic Film
D5047 –  Standard Specification for Polyethylene Terephthalate Film and Sheeting
D6287 –  Standard Practice for Cutting Film and Sheeting Test Specimens
D6988 –  Standard Guide for Determination of Thickness of Plastic Film Test Specimens
D8136 - Standard Test Method for Determining Plastic Film Thickness and Thickness Variability Using a Non-Contact Capacitance Thickness Gauge
E1870 –  Standard Test Method for Odor and Taste Transfer from Polymeric Packaging Film
F2029- Standard Practices for Making Heatseals for Determination of Heatsealability of Flexible Webs as Measured by Seal Strength
F2622 –  Standard Test Method for Oxygen Gas Transmission Rate Through Plastic Film and Sheeting Using Various Sensors

Books and general references
 Hawkins, William E, The Plastic Film and Foil Web Handling Guide CRC Press  2003
Jenkins, W. A., and Osborn, K. R. Plastic Films: Technology and Packaging Applications, CRC Press 1992
 Yam, K. L., "Encyclopedia of Packaging Technology", John Wiley & Sons, 2009, 

Packaging materials
Plastics applications